Municipal South-West was a constituency represented in the Legislative Council of Singapore from 1948 until 1951. It elected two Legislative Council members.

Constituency changes

Legislative Council members

Electoral results

1948

References 

Singaporean electoral divisions